Leonard Raven-Hill (10 March 1867 – 31 March 1942) was an English artist, illustrator and cartoonist.

He was born in Bath and educated at Bristol Grammar School and the Devon county school. He studied art at the Lambeth School of Art and then in Paris under MM. Bougereau and Aimé Morot. He began to exhibit at the Salon in 1887 but moved back to London when he was appointed as the art editor of Pick-Me-Up. He also continued to work as a painter and exhibited at the Royal Academy in 1889. In 1893 he founded, with Arnold Golsworthy, the humorous and artistic monthly The Butterfly (1893–94, revived in 1899–1900) but  began his most prominent association with a publication when his drawings appeared in Punch in December 1895. By 1901 he had joined the staff of Punch as the junior political cartoonist.

He contributed to many other illustrated magazines including The Daily Graphic, Daily Chronicle, The Strand Magazine, The Sketch, Pall Mall Gazette and Windsor Magazine. He also illustrated a number of books including
 East London by Sir Walter Besant (1901)
 Cornish Saints and Sinners by J. H. Harris
 Three Men on the Bummel by Jerome K. Jerome
 Stalky and Co by Rudyard Kipling
  Kipps by H. G. Wells

Raven-Hill published the impressions of his visit to India on the occasion of the tour of the Prince and Princess of Wales as An Indian Sketch-Book (1903) and his other published sketch-books include Our Battalion (1902) and The Promenaders (1894).

In his later years his eyesight began to fail and Raven-Hill died on 31 March 1942 at Ryde on the Isle of Wight.

Notes

References

External links

 
 
 Biography for: Leonard Raven-Hill at www.whistler.arts.gla.ac.uk
 NPG 3046; Self Portrait of Leonard Raven-Hill at www.npg.org.uk
Illustrations from Punch in the image database HeidICON
 

1867 births
1942 deaths
19th-century English painters
20th-century English painters
Artists from Bath, Somerset
British cartoonists
Alumni of the City and Guilds of London Art School
English male painters
People educated at Bristol Grammar School
Punch (magazine) cartoonists
20th-century English male artists
19th-century English male artists